Colares is a civil parish along the coast of the municipality of Sintra.

History

Even before there was a "Portugal", the region of Colares was a place of human movement and settlement. By the Roman occupation of the Iberian Peninsula, the architecture of Colares was carved by Latin inscriptions, such as one found near the mouth of the Maçãs River: SOLI ET LUNAE CESTIVIUS ACIDIVIS PERENNIS LEG. AVG. PR. PR. PROVINCIAE LUSITANAE.

It was conquered and held by Sigurd I of Norway for a few months in 1108, during the Norwegian Crusade.

After a period of Moorish occupation, armies loyal to Afonso Henriques conquered the region, as a sequence of their victory in Sintra, around 1147. The region remained in the hands of the Crown until 1385, when it was donated by John I to the constable Nuno Álvares Pereira to compensate the mercenary for his support against Castile.

These lands returned to the crown following the death of Infanta Beatrice, mother of Manuel I.

The historical village of Colares, which was important in the nation's pre-history, obtained a foral early after its creation. The parish of Nossa Senhora da Assunção was a bishopric rectory in the old comarca of Torres Vedras, and Colares was the seat of its own municipality, attributed to King Afonso III, in May 1255. A new foral was issued on 10 November 1516 by Manuel I.
 
In 1801, the municipality of Colares included 1930 inhabitants, and by 1849, it already had 3341 inhabitants.

During the administrative reforms of 24 October 1855, the municipality of Colares was extinguished and the territory integrated into the municipality of Sintra, as a civil parish.

Grapevines are grown directly upon the sand in the Colares DOC, which covers 50 acres of remaining vineyards.  In the 1940s, vineyards covered 2,500 acres.  Between 1934 and 1994, only the local co-op could use the Colares appellation.

Red wines, which make up 75% of platings, are grown from ramisco grape and are aged over ten years before being marketed.  White wines, grown from a local variant of malvasia, are not aged as long.  Because phylloxera aphids cannot live on sand, Colares vineyards are some of the only European vines that are not grafted upon American rootstocks.

Geography
The civil parish is located on the western coast of Portugal, and marked by Europe's extreme western extent: Cabo da Roca. Its contains the settlements Almoçageme, Atalaia, Azenhas do Mar, Azóia, Colares, Eugaria, Gigarós, Mucifal, Penedo, Praia das Maçãs and Ulgueira.

Climate

Architecture

Prehistoric

 Dolmen of Adrenunes
 Praia das Maçãs Prehistoric Monument

Archaeological

 Archaeological Site of Alto da Vigia
 Roman villa of Santo André de Almoçageme
 Tholos tomb of Bela Vista
 Tholos tomb of Monge

Civic

 Building of Correios, Telégrafos e Telefones (CTT) de Colares
 Vila Vitorino
 Cinema/Theatre Gomes da Silva
 Cellar of the Viscount Salreu
 Estate of Quinta do Casas Novas
 Estate of Quinta da Fonte
 Estate of Quinta da Fonte Velha
 Estate of Quinta de Vale Marinha
 Estate of Quinta do Pé da Serra
 Estate of Quinta do Rio Milho
 Estate of Quinta dos Freixes
 Estate of Quinta Mazziotti/Quinta do França
 Estate of Quinta Milides
 Estate of Nossa Senhora de Melides
 Fountain of Espoujeiro
 Lighthouse of Cabo da Roca
 Pillory of Colares
 Primary School of Azenhas do Mar
 Residence of Quinta da Bela Vista
 Residence of Quinta do Cosme
 Residence of Quinta do Vinagre
 Residence (Pombaline) on Largo do Pelourinho
 Residence (17th century) on Largo do Pelourinho
 Residence on Avenida do Atlântico, 180 
 Residence on Rua da Abreja
 Residence on Rua da República
 Residence Saloia
 Summer cottage of Praia das Maçãs
 Villa Guida
 (Old) Casino of Praia das Maçãs

Military

 Castle of Colares

Religious

 Chapel of the Misericórdia of Colares
 Chapel of Nossa Senhora das Mercês
 Chapel of Nossa Senhora da Praia
 Chapel of São Lourenço
 Church of Almoçageme
 Church of Nossa Senhora da Assunção
 Convent of Santa Ana
 Convent of Santa Cruz
 Convent of São Saturino
 Hermitage of Nossa Senhora da Conceição de Ulgueira
 Sanctuary of Nossa Senhora da Peninha

See also
 Colares DOC

References

Parishes of Sintra